Faurea is a genus containing 16 species of flowering plants in the protea family which occur in the summer rainfall area of southern Africa, extending to tropical Africa and Madagascar. The name honours South African soldier and botanist William Caldwell Faure (1822-1844) who was killed on active service in India.

Species
Described species are:

 Faurea arborea Engl.
 Faurea argentea Hutch.
 Faurea coriacea Marner
 Faurea delevoyi De Wild.
 Faurea discolor Welw.
 Faurea forficuliflora Baker
 Faurea galpinii E.Phillips
 Faurea intermedia  Engl. & Gilg
 Faurea lucida De Wild.
 Faurea macnaughtonii E.Phillips
 Faurea racemosa Farmar
 Faurea recondita Rourke & V.R.Clark
 Faurea rochetiana (A.Rich.) Chiov. ex Pic.Serm.
 Faurea rubriflora Marner 
 Faurea saligna Harv.
 Faurea wentzeliana Engl.

References

 
Proteaceae genera
Taxonomy articles created by Polbot
Afrotropical realm flora